Malye Ivki is a rural locality (a village) in Gorodishchenskoye Rural Settlement, Nyuksensky District, Vologda Oblast, Russia. The population was 3 as of 2002.

Geography 
Malye Ivki is located 53 km south of Nyuksenitsa (the district's administrative centre) by road. Bolshiye Ivki is the nearest rural locality.

References 

Rural localities in Nyuksensky District